Wusterwitz is a municipality in the Potsdam-Mittelmark district, in Brandenburg, Germany. Wusterwitz has a population of approximately 3,000 inhabitants.

Demography

Personalities 
 Engelbert Wusterwitz (1385-1433), chronicler of the Brandenburg story, his family came from Großwusterwitz
 Werner Nothe (born 1938), politician (SED), 1989 to 1990 Lord Mayor of Magdeburg, born in Großwusterwitz

References

Localities in Potsdam-Mittelmark